The Church of St Michael and All Angels is an Anglican church in Ledbury, in Herefordshire, England. The oldest parts date from the 12th century, and most of the building is of the 13th and 14th centuries. It is Grade I listed, described in the listing text as "one of the finest churches in Herefordshire".

Description
The Domesday Book of 1086 records a minster church in Ledbury, in a period before there were parish churches in villages. The oldest part of the present church, dating from the 12th century, are the centre of the west front including the door surround, and the chancel. High on the walls of the chancel are circular windows, once part of a clerestory above low aisles in the original building, now seen from within high aisles.

The north aisle is of the 13th century; bases of pillars in the north arcade at the west end are thought to date from the earlier Norman church. The south aisle and arcade are of the 14th century.

The chapter house, north of the north aisle and facing the chancel, was built about 1320. It may have been built as a shrine to Katherine of Ledbury and was formerly called the Chapel of St Katherine.

Restoration in the 19th century included installation of stained glass windows, and replacement of the pews.

Tower
The tower, north of the church, is separate from the rest of the building, perhaps because a stream running under the church made the foundations not firm enough for a tower at the west end. It dates from about 1230 for three stages; a top stage with a single light on each side and battlements, and an octagonal stone spire, were built in 1732 by Nathaniel Wilkinson of Worcester, who rebuilt several church spires in nearby counties.

Memorials
The memorials inside the church include monuments to Daniel Ellis Saunders (died 1825) and Robert Myddelton Biddulph (1761–1814), both by Richard Westmacott; William Miles (died 1803) by John Flaxman; and Anthony Biddulph (died 1718) and his wife Constance (died 1706). On the south wall near the altar there is a 17th-century canopied monument to Edward and Elizabeth Skynner. The couple are shown kneeling, and a baby between them is a child who died young; below them are shown their five sons and five daughters who survived to adulthood.

References

Grade I listed churches in Herefordshire
Church of England church buildings in Herefordshire
Diocese of Hereford